Harishchandrachi Factory is a 2009 Indian Marathi-language biographical film written and directed by Paresh Mokashi. It is about Dadasaheb Phalke, who made the first Indian feature film Raja Harishchandra (1913), and starring Nandu Madhav as him and Vibhavari Deshpande as his wife Saraswati. Harishchandrachi Factory focuses on the struggle Phalke faced during its production.

The film is the directorial debut of Paresh Mokashi who won the Best Director award at Pune International Film Festival, where the film was shown. In September 2009, it was selected as India's official entry to Academy Award in the Best Foreign Language Film Category,  making it the second film, after Shwaas (2004), in Marathi cinema to receive this honour.

Overview

The film depicts the making of India's first full-length feature film by Dadasaheb Phalke.

Cast
 Nandu Madhav as Dadasaheb Phalke
 Vibhavari Deshpande as Saraswati Phalke
 Sandeep Pathak as Trymbak B. Telang
 Bhalchandra Kadam as Deaf and dumb actor
 Satish Alekar as Lawyer (Special Appearance) 
 Jitendra Joshi as Parsi in theatre in beginning of movie (Special Appearance)
 Hrishikesh Joshi as School Teacher in beginning of Movie (Special Appearance)
Pravin Tarde as Carpenter

Critical reception
The film was officially released in India on 29 January 2010 and received critical appreciation.

Awards and honours

References

Awards

External links
 
 
 Harishchandrachi Factory, Film Review in The Hollywood Reporter
 Harishchandrachi Factory, Film Review
 Harishchandrachi Factory, Background Score Review

2009 films
2009 comedy films
Indian biographical films
Films about filmmaking
Films set in the 1910s
Indian comedy films
UTV Motion Pictures films
Best Marathi Feature Film National Film Award winners
2000s biographical films
2009 directorial debut films
2000s Marathi-language films
Films directed by Paresh Mokashi
Films scored by Anand Modak